"The Curious Case of Edgar Witherspoon" is the thirty-sixth episode and the first episode of the third season (1988–89) of the television series The Twilight Zone. In this episode, a psychiatrist examines a man who claims that a mobile in his basement composed of assorted odds and ends is all that prevents the world from collapsing into disaster.

Plot
Dr. Jeremy Sinclair, a psychiatrist at a mental hospital, is referred to an elderly bachelor named Edgar Witherspoon. Witherspoon spends all his time frantically scavenging for assorted items such as baby bottles and doll heads, rooting through garbage and even stealing to acquire them. Witherspoon has holed up in his apartment, refusing to let anyone else inside. Sinclair visits his apartment. Witherspoon is irritable, ill-mannered, and shows obvious signs of manic obsession, but also appears harmless. His niece insists that he is becoming a danger to himself and others, and implores Sinclair to examine him more closely.

On his second visit, Sinclair uses threats to get Witherspoon to let him inside. The apartment is dominated by a gigantic, haphazardly designed contraption made up of numerous clocks and odds and ends. Witherspoon recounts how after he retired from his job as an engineer, he found his life had become purposeless. At the peak of depression, he began hearing a voice which instructs him on the items which need to be added to the contraption. He compares the world to a clock that needs small adjustments in order to continue; adding items keeps the world from falling apart. Recognizing a textbook case of a person trying to fill a void of purpose in their life, Sinclair has Witherspoon taken in for observation. Witherspoon struggles, claiming that he cannot leave his machine alone. Sinclair accidentally dislodges a few paper clips from the device. As mental hospital affiliates lead Witherspoon away, he shouts that the island Tattua has ceased to exist because of the disruption, and tells Sinclair to check the time: it is 3:17.

Back in his office, Sinclair hears a news bulletin announcing that Tattua was destroyed by a tsunami at 3:17. Sinclair runs out and orders Witherspoon's release. Sinclair stops the landlady from dismantling the machine, claiming that he needs to observe it to better understand Witherspoon's delusions. The landlady is reluctant to let it stand, so Sinclair offers to rent the apartment himself.

Witherspoon returns, and says that the voice has suggested he move to Miami to retire. Sinclair protests that the machine cannot be abandoned again—it already needs adjustments, which he himself makes by adding water to a set of scales. Witherspoon smiles and says that his time protecting the planet has ended, and the mantle has passed to Sinclair. He leaves, and Sinclair responds to a voice only he can hear: a tambourine needs to be added to the device immediately.

Production
This was the first Twilight Zone aired to be shot in Toronto. A close up of a street sign reveals that Edgar Witherspoon lives on Laing Street in Leslieville; Leslieville is actually a neighbourhood in Toronto's east end. Directly across the street from the Witherspoon house on Laing Street is Maple Cottage, where Alexander Muir wrote "The Maple Leaf Forever" in 1867.

External links
 

1988 American television episodes
The Twilight Zone (1985 TV series season 3) episodes

fr:Le Cas étrange d'Edgar Witherspoon